Salhus may refer to:

Places
Salhus, Vestland, a village in Bergen municipality, Vestland county, Norway
Salhus Church, a church in Bergen municipality, Vestland county, Norway
Salhus, Nordland, a village in Brønnøy municipality, Nordland county, Norway
Salhus, Rogaland, a village in Karmøy municipality, Rogaland county, Norway

Other
IL Norna-Salhus, a sports club based in Bergen municipality, Vestland county, Norway